KKTZ (107.5 FM) is a radio station airing a hot adult contemporary format licensed to Mountain Home, Arkansas. The station serves the areas of Mountain Home, Arkansas, Branson, Missouri, Harrison, Arkansas, and West Plains, Missouri, and is owned by Mac Partners.

Previous logo

References

External links
KKTZ's website

Hot adult contemporary radio stations in the United States
KTZ
Mountain Home, Arkansas
1985 establishments in Arkansas
Radio stations established in 1985